"Reflection" is a song written and produced by Matthew Wilder and David Zippel for the soundtrack of Disney's 1998 animated film Mulan. In the film, the song is performed by Tony Award winner, Filipina singer and actress Lea Salonga as Fa Mulan. An accompanying music video for "Reflection" was included as a bonus to the Disney Gold Classic Collection DVD release of the film in February 2000. Reflection has received highly positive reviews, with critics highlighting its emotional writing and Salonga's vocals.

A single version of the song was recorded by American singer Christina Aguilera and became her debut single. She was 17 at the time it was released. The single's commercial success funded Aguilera's debut album from RCA, in addition to gaining her credibility amongst established writers and producers. Releases of the single were limited, which resulted in the track charting only on the Billboard Adult Contemporary chart. An accompanying music video for the song was included on the DVD release of Mulan. Aguilera has performed the track on four televised performances, including at the CBS This Morning show, which saw her gain the attention of songwriter Diane Warren. A later, the remix by Eric Kupper was released. In 2020, Aguilera re-recorded the song for the live adaptation of Mulan.

Use in Mulan
In the film Mulan, the song is recorded by Filipina singer and actress Lea Salonga as the title character Mulan. "Reflection", which lasts for 2:27 was written and produced by Matthew Wilder and David Zippel, in the key of A major. Salonga's vocal range spans from the low-note of G♯3 to the high-note of D5 in a moderately slow tempo of 119 beats per minute. The film version truncates the song from the original full version, which runs 3:40 and consists of one more verse and chorus.

The song is performed after Mulan returns home following a humiliating and failed attempt to impress her matchmaker. The lyrical content expresses the way Mulan feels about wanting to show the world who she really is instead of pretending to be who she is not, but is afraid to disappoint her family by doing so. This scene takes place at Mulan's home in its surrounding gardens and ends in her family temple, where she removes her makeup to reveal her true appearance.

In 2015, Salonga revealed that she was asked to re-record the song back in 1996 in its shortened form as the producers saw that the first version is not moving the story along.

Christina Aguilera versions

1998 version

Aguilera approached record label RCA, then having financial difficulties, and was told to contact Disney. After being given the opportunity to record "Reflection", it was reported she had gained a record deal with RCA Records. After she was asked to hit E5, the highest note required for "Reflection", she thought that the song could be the gateway into an album deal. Aguilera spent hours recording a cover of Whitney Houston's "Run to You", which included the note she was asked to hit. After successfully hitting the note, which she called "the note that changed my life", she was given the opportunity to record the song. Due to the success around the recording of "Reflection", RCA wished for Aguilera to record and release an album by September 1998 to maintain the "hype" surrounding her at that time. The label laid the foundation for the album immediately and started presenting Aguilera with tracks for her debut album, which they later decided would have a January 1999 release. "Reflection" was adopted as a track on the album.

Serving as her debut single, Aguilera's version of "Reflection" was released to adult contemporary radio on June 15, 1998. The song was released as a CD single in Japan on September 16, 1998.

Reception
Beth Johnson of Entertainment Weekly noted Aguilera has a "who-am-I musings" persona in the song, while Stephen Thomas Erlewine of AllMusic commented that the "Matthew Wilder and David Zippel's full-fledged songs [on Mulan] are flat and unmemorable." "Reflection" peaked at number 19 on the Adult Contemporary chart. After the success of the track, Aguilera's record label RCA decided to fund her debut album (costing over one million dollars), and eventually funded more than they had predicted initially.

Live performances
Aguilera performed the song on television four times, first on the CBS This Morning, and then on the Donny & Marie show; neither of these performances were directed at her demographic of teen viewers. Whilst watching the show on This Morning, Aguilera gained the attention of songwriter Diane Warren, who was astonished by such a young performer being as "polished" as she was. Warren later stated that she had seen the potential in Aguilera. The singer also performed "Reflection" on MuchMusic's Intimate and Interactive on May 17, 2000. An ABC special in 2000, featuring a performance of the song, was recorded and released in a DVD titled My Reflection. The song was later included in the setlist for Aguilera's Vegas residency Christina Aguilera: The Xperience.

International versions
Aguilera's version of the song was re-dubbed into a number of languages to be featured in their respective foreign soundtracks released in 1998. In 2000, Aguilera  herself recorded her own Spanish-language version of "Reflection", titled "Mi Reflejo" which was adapted by Rudy Pérez for her second studio album of the same name. As both Spanish soundtracks had been released two years earlier, each featuring their own end-credits version, Aguilera's version was not featured in either of them. For the Latin-American market, the song was titled "Reflejo" and performed in Spanish-language by Mexican singer Lucero. In her Korean version of the song, titled "내안의 나를" ("Naeane naleul"), Korean American singer Lena Park went up to an A5. Hong Kong-American singer and actress Coco Lee performed a Mandarin version of the song titled "自己" ("Zìjǐ"), after she was called to voice the character of Mulan in the Mandarin dubbing distributed in Taiwan.

Track listing

Australian CD single
"Reflection" (performed by Christina Aguilera) – 3:34
"Honor To Us All" (performed by Beth Fowler, Lea Salonga, Marnie Nixon) – 3:03

Japan CD Mini single
"Reflection" (performed by Christina Aguilera) – 3:34
"Reflection" (performed by Lea Salonga) – 2:27

Taiwan CD Mini single Promo
"Reflection" (performed by Christina Aguilera) – 3:34
"True To Your Heart" (performed by 98 Degrees & Stevie Wonder) – 4:17

Charts

Release history

2020 version

Although the live action remake was announced not to be a musical, on February 27, 2020, Aguilera announced that she had recorded a new version of the song for the upcoming movie, which was going to be featured in the movie soundtrack. Film composer Harry Gregson-Williams provided the orchestra for Aguilera's re-recorded version, and film director Niki Caro directed the music video.

Reception
In December 2020, PopSugar UK'''s Kelsie Gibson named the release of "Reflection" as one of the top 15 nostalgic moments of the year. It was nominated for the Best Adapted Song at the 2021 Online Film & Television Association Awards.

International versions

Later that year, Coco Lee also announced that she was going to re-record the Mandarin end-credits version of the song, as she had already done in 1998. On March 8, 2020, Coco's Mandarin version was also covered by actress Liu Yifei for the soundtrack of the live-action, while a brand-new Japanese and Korean versions were recorded by singers Minami Kizuki and Lee Su-hyun respectively. On September 4, 2020, a Hindi, Tamil, and Telugu versions were released on the Indian Vevo channel, with Indian singer Nithayashree Venkataramanan performing the song both in Tamil and Telugu, even though no such versions of the animated movie were ever released. The song was released to accompany the Indonesian-dubbed version of the movie on Disney+ Hotstar.

Charts

Certifications

 Other versions 
The group Mannheim Steamroller covered the song on their 1999 album, Mannheim Steamroller Meets the Mouse. Michael Crawford covered this song in The Disney Album. His rendition replaces the word "girl" with "man". Singer and American Idol winner Jordin Sparks performed the song on the Dedication Week of the sixth season of the show, with the performance she moved forward to the next round.  Jackie Evancho also covered the song on her fourth studio album, Songs from the Silver Screen. In La Voz... Argentina (the Argentinian version of The Voice''), the Spanish version of the song was covered by Sofia Rangone. During the Chinese competition show Singer 2018, British Singer Jessie J performed a rearranged version of the song, during episode 11, gaining her fifth first place. Filipino Singer Katrina Velarde also did a cover premiered on 15 September 2020 on her official YouTube channel.

Notes

References

External links

1998 debut singles
1998 songs
Christina Aguilera songs
Lea Salonga songs
Songs from Mulan (franchise)
Pop ballads
Songs written by Matthew Wilder
RCA Records singles
Disney Renaissance songs
Walt Disney Records singles
Songs written by Rudy Pérez
Song recordings produced by Rudy Pérez
Songs with lyrics by David Zippel
1990s ballads
Contemporary R&B ballads